Colette Ndzana Fegue (born 19 July 2000), known as Colette Ndzana, is a Cameroonian professional footballer and former futsal player who plays as a left back for Spanish  Liga F club UD Granadilla Tenerife and the Cameroon women's national team.

Club career
Ndzana first played for Éclair FC in Cameroon.

International career
Ndzana has won the silver medal at the 2019 African Games with the Cameroon women's national under-20 team. She capped at senior level during the 2020 CAF Women's Olympic Qualifying Tournament.

As a futsal player, Ndzana has competed at 2018 Summer Youth Olympics.

References

2000 births
Living people

Women's futsal players
Futsal players at the 2018 Summer Youth Olympics
Cameroonian women's footballers
Women's association football fullbacks
UD Granadilla Tenerife players
Primera División (women) players
Competitors at the 2019 African Games
African Games silver medalists for Cameroon
Cameroon women's international footballers
African Games medalists in football
Cameroonian expatriate women's footballers
Cameroonian expatriate sportspeople in Belarus
Expatriate women's footballers in Belarus
Cameroonian expatriate sportspeople in Spain
Expatriate women's footballers in Spain